George Love may refer to:

 George M. Love (1831–1887), colonel in the Union Army and Medal of Honor recipient
 George H. Love (1900–1991), American businessman and industrialist